14 teams took part in the league with FC Spartak Moscow winning the championship.

League standings

Results

Top scorers
11 goals
 Andrei Zazroyev (Dynamo Kiev)

8 goals
 Vladimir Ilyin (Dynamo Moscow)
 Aleksei Paramonov (Spartak Moscow)

7 goals
 Avtandil Chkuaseli (Dinamo Tbilisi)

5 goals
 Vladimir Bogdanovich (Dynamo Kiev)
 Yuri Fetiskin (Kalinin)
 Vasili Fomin (Dynamo Leningrad)
 Aleksandr Ivanov (Zenit Leningrad)
 Aleksei Kolobov (Dynamo Leningrad)
 Nikita Simonyan (Spartak Moscow)
 Vladimir Tsvetkov (Dynamo Leningrad)

References

 Soviet Union - List of final tables (RSSSF)

1952
1
Soviet
Soviet